The 1979–80 Iraq FA Cup was the fourth edition of the Iraq FA Cup as a clubs-only competition. The tournament was won by Al-Jaish for the first time, beating Al-Talaba 4–2 on penalties in the final after a 1–1 draw, with Al-Jaish goalkeeper Fatah Al-Ani saving penalties from Ali Hussein Shihab and Wamidh Khudhor in the shootout. The first two rounds were between teams from the lower division, before the top-flight clubs entered at the round of 32, where Al-Zawraa beat Al-Umal 4–0.

Bracket 
From the Round of 16 onwards:

Matches

Final

Top scorers

References

External links
 Iraqi Football Website

Iraq FA Cup
Cup